Book Club is a 2018 American romantic comedy film directed by Bill Holderman, in his directorial debut, and written by Holderman and Erin Simms. It stars Diane Keaton, Jane Fonda, Candice Bergen, and Mary Steenburgen as four friends who read Fifty Shades of Grey as part of their monthly book club, and subsequently begin to change how they view their personal relationships.

The film was released on May 18, 2018, by Paramount Pictures, and received mixed reviews from critics, but the performances of the film's cast were widely praised and it was a box office success, grossing over $104 million worldwide against its $14 million budget.

Plot
Four women have attended a monthly book club for 40 years, bonding over the suggested literature, and have become very good friends:

 Vivian, who owns and builds hotels, runs into Arthur, a man whose marriage proposal she turned down 40 years before. They begin a flirtation, but she has always refused to settle down because she enjoys her independence.

 Diane is recently widowed, and her daughters would like her to move closer to them in Arizona because they perceive her to be in danger as she lives alone.

 Sharon is a federal judge who's been single since she divorced her son's father over 18 years ago.

 Carol has a successful marriage to Bruce, who has recently retired, but they have recently lacked intimacy.

One day, they read Fifty Shades of Grey and are turned on by the content. Viewing it as a wake-up call, they decide to expand their lives and chase pleasures that have eluded them.

While flying to visit her daughters in Arizona, Diane meets Mitchell and they strike up a relationship, though she is hesitant because of how recently her husband died and because she hasn't dated in decades. Vivian spends more time with Arthur, but her fear of commitment makes her keep him at a distance. Carol is frustrated with her husband's refusal to have sex with her, and by reading the book she realizes they are missing something. Sharon starts an online dating account to start dating again.

They continue to read Fifty Shades Darker and Fifty Shades Freed in their book club, while trying to figure out how to solve their problems. Diane's daughters continue to pressure her to move to Arizona but she doesn't want to leave her friends. She sneaks away to see Mitchell, and when her daughters can't reach her, they send the police out to find her. On discovering her at Mitchell's, they insist she move into the basement of one of their homes, essentially ending her relationship with him. Eventually, Diane tells her daughters that though she is older, she doesn't need to be under surveillance. She packs up her belongings and leaves for Mitchell's, where they resume their relationship.

Arthur asks Vivian to commit to being in a relationship and she declines, despite his assurances that he wants her to continue being independent. Soon after he leaves for the airport, Vivian realizes she's made a mistake and tries to go after him. She misses his airplane, but when she returns to her hotel, she finds Arthur waiting for her and they rekindle their relationship.

Carol, frustrated that Bruce is refusing to have sex with her, tries various ways to entice him, but he's completely oblivious. Eventually she spikes his beer with erectile dysfunction medication, but he becomes angry because that is not what's causing the problem, and they continue to not have sex. Bruce admits that he's been stressed because he retired, and doesn't know what to do with himself. They eventually reconcile after dancing together in a fund-raising talent show.

After a few dates with men she meets online, Sharon decides that it isn't for her. She gives a speech at her son's engagement party, where she realizes that everyone deserves to be in love and happy. She opens her online dating account again, in the hopes of finding someone.

Cast
 Diane Keaton as Diane
 Jane Fonda as Vivian 
 Candice Bergen as Sharon 
 Mary Steenburgen as Carol 
 Andy García as Mitchell
 Don Johnson as Arthur
 Craig T. Nelson as Bruce 
 Richard Dreyfuss as George
 Alicia Silverstone as Jill
 Katie Aselton as Adrianne
 Ed Begley Jr. as Tom
 Wallace Shawn as Derek
 Lili Bordán as Irene
 Tommy Dewey as Chris
 Mircea Monroe as Cheryl

E. L. James and her husband Niall Leonard make a cameo appearance as Carol and Bruce's neighbors.

Production
In May 2017, it was announced Diane Keaton, Jane Fonda and Candice Bergen had joined the cast of the film, with Bill Holderman directing, from a screenplay by himself and Erin Simms. Holderman and Simms also produced the film, along with Andrew Duncan and Alex Saks, the latter two under their June Pictures banner. In July 2017, Mary Steenburgen joined the cast, and in August 2017, Andy García, Don Johnson, Craig T. Nelson, Richard Dreyfuss, Ed Begley Jr., Wallace Shawn, Alicia Silverstone, Tommy Dewey and Katie Aselton joined as well.

Principal photography began in August 2017 around Santa Clarita, California.

Release
In November 2017, Paramount Pictures acquired U.S, UK and France distribution rights to the film. It was released on May 18, 2018.

Home media 
Book Club was released on Digital HD, Blu-ray and DVD in August 2018.

Reception

Box office
Book Club grossed $68.6 million in the United States and Canada, and $35.9 million in other territories, for a worldwide total of $104.4 million.

In the United States and Canada, the film was released alongside Deadpool 2 and Show Dogs, and was projected to gross around $10 million from 2,781 theaters in its opening weekend. It made $4.7 million on its first day, including $625,000 from Thursday night previews. It went on to debut to $13.6 million, finishing third, behind Deadpool 2 and Avengers: Infinity War; 80% of its audience was female while 88% was over the age of 35. It dropped just 25% in its second weekend to $10.1 million, finishing fourth, and continued to hold well in its third weekend, grossing $6.8 million and finishing fifth.

Critical response
The website's critical consensus reads, "Book Club only intermittently rises to the level of its impressive veteran cast; fortunately, they're more than enough to bring pedestrian material entertainingly to life." On Metacritic, the film has a weighted average score of 53 out of 100, based on 37 critics, indicating "mixed or average reviews". Audiences polled by CinemaScore gave the film an average grade of "A−" on an A+ to F scale, while PostTrak reported filmgoers gave it 4 out of 5 stars.

Sequel

In June 2019, Mary Steenburgen confirmed news of a sequel. In September 2019, producer and co-writer of the film, Erin Simms, offered further confirmation. The script was written, but due to the COVID-19 pandemic filming was put back to mid 2021 and the film is expected to be released in 2022. It is expected that the characters Diane, Vivian, Sharon, Carol, Mitchell, Arthur, Bruce, Jill and Adrianne will all reappear. In May 2022, Variety announced that the sequel, titled Book Club: The Next Chapter, had begun production with Keaton, Fonda, Bergen, Steenburgen, Garcia, Johnson, and Nelson reprising their roles from the first film. Focus Features will replace Paramount as domestic distributor, with Universal Pictures distributing internationally. In July 2022, Deadline confirmed that the sequel's release date was set for May 12, 2023.

References

External links 
 

2018 films
2010s English-language films
2010s buddy comedy films
2010s female buddy films
2018 romantic comedy films
American buddy comedy films
American female buddy films
American romantic comedy films
Fifty Shades
Films about books
Films about divorce
Films about friendship
Films about old age
Films about widowhood
Films set in Arizona
Films set in Los Angeles
Films set in hotels
Films set on airplanes
Films shot in Los Angeles
Midlife crisis films
Paramount Pictures films
2018 directorial debut films
2010s American films